is a Japanese voice actress from Takatsuki, Osaka, affiliated with Arts Vision. She is the twin sister of Risae Matsuda. Both were the 4th and 5th Anisong Grand Prix Finalists with Marina Kawano (4th) and Konomi Suzuki (5th).

Filmography

Television animation
2014
Saki: The Nationals, Hiroe Atago

2015
The Idolmaster Cinderella Girls, Syoko Hoshi
Ultimate Otaku Teacher, Komiya Nagare

2016
Beyblade Burst, Jin Aizawa, Ichirō Kakitani
Fune o Amu, Sen
Koukaku no Pandora, Vlind
Magical Girl Raising Project, Yuna Amasato
The Asterisk War, Shenyun Li

2017
Battle Girl High School, Miku Hoshitsuki
Beyblade Burst God, Kit Lopez
Clockwork Planet, Vermouth
Nana Maru San Batsu, Jinko Sasajima
The Idolmaster Cinderella Girls Theater, Syoko Hoshi

2018
Kaiju Girls, Guts Shadow
Anima Yell!, Tamako Nekoya
Beyblade Burst Super Z, Kit Lopez, Gumita

2019
Stars Align, Kei Takada

2020
Healin' Good PreCure, Touji Sawaizumi, Rina

2021
Kiyo in Kyoto: From the Maiko House, Tsurukoma
Kageki Shojo!!, Chiaki Sawada
Drugstore in Another World, Elaine

2022
Miss Kuroitsu from the Monster Development Department, Hydra's second and fourth sisters
Smile of the Arsnotoria the Animation, Spirit
Arknights: Prelude To Dawn, Misha
Spy × Family, Kim Campbell (ep. 22)

Original net animation
JoJo's Bizarre Adventure: Stone Ocean (2021), Female Prison A (ep. 6)

Theatrical animation
Okko's Inn (2018), Makoto Tachiuri
Survival (2020), Geo
Jujutsu Kaisen 0 (2021), Nanako Hasaba
Joshi Kōsei to Mahō no Note (2022), Bulbul-kun

Video games
The Idolm@ster Cinderella Girls (xxxx), Syoko Hoshi
Shirohime Quest (xxxx)
Metal Max 4: Gekkō no Diva (xxxx)
Exile Election (xxxx), Aasha Tadenomiya
Azur Lane (2017), KMS Madgeburg
Onsen Musume: Yunohana Collection (xxxx), Erina Ibusuki
Master of Eternity (2018), Anna
Livestream: Escape from Hotel Izanami (2021), Azusa Shiraishi

Live-action Drama
Kikai Sentai Zenkaiger (2021), Ricky Goldtsuiker/TwokaiRicky (voice)

Dubbing

Live-action
Independence Day: Resurgence, Daisy Blackwell (Mckenna Grace)

Animation
The Addams Family, Kayla
PAW Patrol, Rubble
PAW Patrol: The Movie, Rubble

References

External links
Official agency profile 

1993 births
Living people
Actresses from Osaka
Arts Vision voice actors
Japanese video game actresses
Japanese voice actresses
People from Takatsuki, Osaka
Twin actresses
Japanese twins
21st-century Japanese actresses